Franco Marazzi (4 November 1925 – 21 September 2014) was a Swiss director. He directed 9 films and shows in 7 years. He is mostly known for being the director in the Eurovision Song Contest 1956.

Marazzi started his career as a reporter in 1954 in Zürich. He first directed the Eurovision Song Contest 1956. In 1958, he was the creator of TSI.

Filmography

References

External links
 
 Franco Marazzi, in: Historisches Lexikon der Schweiz (HLS)

1925 births
2014 deaths
Swiss television directors
Eurovision Song Contest people
Swiss film directors